Bhogaon or Bhongaon is a town and a nagar panchayat in Mainpuri district  in the state of Uttar Pradesh, India. The Grand Trunk Road passes through Bhogaon and National Highway 92 originates from here.

Demographics
 India census, Bhogaon had a population of 26,799. Males constitute 53% of the population and females 47%. Bhogaon has an average literacy rate of 55%, lower than the national average of 59.5%; with male literacy of 61% and female literacy of 47%. 17% of the population is under 6 years of age.

Geography

Villages in Bhogaon tehsil
 Aryapur Khera
 Chhachha

References

External links
 About Bhongaon

Cities and towns in Mainpuri district